Acme  is a village in south-central Alberta, Canada. It was the first village to be incorporated in Kneehill County.

The name Acme is derived from the village's railway heritage. When the Canadian Pacific Railway reached the area in 1909, the village's station became the most northernly stop on the company's network. The moniker Acme (of Greek origin, meaning 'the highest point') was thus applied to the community by CPR surveyors of the day.  The first train arrived July 7, 1910, and the village was incorporated that day as well.

Demographics 

In the 2016 Census of Population conducted by Statistics Canada, the Village of Acme recorded a population of 653 living in 281 of its 301 total private dwellings, which represents no change from its 2011 population of 653.

Economy 
The primary industries in the Acme area are agriculture, including livestock and grain farming, and oil and natural gas. Trucking also plays a significant role in the local economy, mostly supporting the agriculture industry.

Culture 
Cultural facilities within Acme include the Acme Municipal Library and the Acme Community Centre. The community centre replaced the village's Memorial Hall that was lost to fire in 2004.

Attractions 
Acme is home to a campground, curling rink, golf course, outdoor pool, outdoor skating rink, beach volleyball pit, soccer field, three ball diamonds, numerous parks, and a senior centre. Squash, racquetball, and wallyball courts are located in a building attached to Acme School.

Education 
Acme School, operated by Golden Hills Regional Division No. 75, serves students in kindergarten through grade 6 and students in grades 10 through 12. Students in grades 7 through 9 attend Dr. Elliott Community School in nearby Linden. Acme School's high school sports teams are nicknamed the Redmen.

Clubs and organizations 
Acme has a variety of local clubs and societies, including a Royal Canadian Legion branch, a senior association, an Elks of Canada club, a Masonic Lodge, and a variety of other organizations, including multiple church groups.

Climate

Notable people 
Honourable Helen Hunley - first female Lieutenant Governor of Alberta
Constance Elaine "Connie" Osterman, Canadian politician, Progressive Conservative MLA and cabinet minister (1979-1992)

See also 
List of communities in Alberta
List of villages in Alberta

References

External links 

1910 establishments in Alberta
Kneehill County
Villages in Alberta
1910 establishments in Canada